Cristóbal Magallanes Jara, also known as Christopher Magallanes (July 30, 1869 – May 25, 1927), was Mexican Catholic priest and martyr who was killed without trial on the way to say Mass during the Cristero War. He had faced the trumped-up charge of inciting rebellion.

Early life 

Cristóbal Magallanes Jara was born in Totatiche, Jalisco, Mexico on July 30, 1869.  He was son of Rafael Magallanes Romero and Clara Jara Sanchez, who were farmers. He worked as a shepherd in his youth and enrolled in the Conciliar Seminary of San José in Guadalajara at the age of 19.

Ordination and priestly life
Cristóbal was ordained at the age of 30 at Santa Teresa in Guadalajara in 1899 and served as chaplain of the School of Arts and Works of the Holy Spirit in Guadalajara. He was then designated as the parish priest for his hometown of Totatiche, where he helped found schools and carpentry shops and assisted in planning for hydrological works, including the dam of La Candelaria. He took special interest in the evangelization of the local indigenous Huichol people and was instrumental in the foundation of the mission in the indigenous town of Azqueltán.

When government decrees closed the seminary in Guadalajara in 1914, Magallanes offered to open a clandestine seminary in his parish. In July 1915, he opened the Auxiliary Seminary of Totatiche, which achieved a student body of 17 students by the following year and was recognized by the Archbishop of Guadalajara, José Francisco Orozco y Jiménez, who appointed a precept and two professors to the seminary.

Death
Magallanes wrote and preached against armed rebellion, but was falsely accused of promoting the Cristero Rebellion in the area. Arrested on May 21, 1927, while en route to celebrate Mass at a farm, he gave away his few remaining possessions to his executioners, gave them absolution, and without a trial, he was killed four days later with Agustín Caloca in Colotlán, Jalisco. His last words to his executioners were "I die innocent, and ask God that my blood may serve to unite my Mexican brethren." He was succeeded as parish priest of Totatiche by José Pilar Quezada Valdés, who went on to become the first bishop of the Archdiocese of Acapulco.

Legacy
Magallanes was canonized by Pope John Paul II on May 21, 2000. He is celebrated in the Catholic Church with an optional memorial on 21 May.

The concluding sequence of the movie For Greater Glory (2012) says that the fictional character "Father Christopher" portrayed by actor Peter O'Toole was based on Cristobal Magallanes Jara.

Agustín Caloca Cortés

Agustín Caloca Cortés (May 5, 1898 – May 25, 1927) was one of the martyrs of Mexico during the Cristero War. Cortés was canonized on May 21, 2000 as part of "Cristóbal Magallanes Jara and 19 other companions".

Life
Agustin Caloca Cortés was born in San Juan Bautista del Teúl, Zacatecas, on the ranch of La Presa. His parents, Eduwiges and María Plutarca Cortés Caloca, were simple peasants. He began his clerical studies at the Guadalajara Seminary, but in 1914 this campus was closed due to the anticlericalism of the Carrancista leaders. He then went to the Auxiliary Seminary of Our Lady of Guadalupe in Totatiche established by Cristóbal Magallanes Jara. In 1919 he re-entered the Guadalajara Seminary to study Theology. He was ordained on August 5, 1923, in the Cathedral Church of Guadalajara.

At the request of Jara, Cortés was assigned as a parish priest and as prefect of the auxiliary seminary. In December 1926 he had to flee with eleven fifth year students to Cocoatzco, where he remained until April 1927. In May 1927, he arrived at the seminary to announce that Mexican government soldiers were approaching Totatiche.  He ordered the students to abandon the seminary and disperse among the town's population.  After helping the students escape, he was taken prisoner and transferred to a jail in Colotlán where he was reunited with Magallanes Jara. He was purportedly offered his freedom by a military officer on account of his young age, but Caloca Cortes refused unless freedom was also granted to Magallanes Jara.

His last words before execution by firing squad were, "We live for God and for Him we die."

He was originally buried in Colotlán but his remains were later exhumed and transferred to the parish of San Juan Bautista in El Teúl.

References

External links
 Genealogy of Cristóbal Magallanes Jara
Saints of the Cristero War
Baptism Record of Cristobal Magallanes Jara

1869 births
1927 deaths
Cristero War
Mexican Roman Catholic priests
Mexican Roman Catholic saints
Martyred Roman Catholic priests
Executed Mexican people
20th-century executions by Mexico
Victims of anti-Catholic violence in Mexico
People from Jalisco
20th-century Roman Catholic martyrs
20th-century Christian saints
Beatifications by Pope John Paul II
Canonizations by Pope John Paul II